Jorge Rubio may refer to:

Jorge Rubio (boxing trainer), Cuban trainer
Jorge Rubio (baseball) (1945–2020), Major League Baseball pitcher